Nicholas Douglas may refer to:

Nick Douglas, American musician
Nicholas Douglas (student athlete), see 2012 CARIFTA Games
Nicholas Douglas, of the Douglases of Mains, Scotland